Bosnia and Herzegovina participated in the Eurovision Song Contest 2001 with the song "Hano" written and performed by Nino Pršeš. The Bosnian broadcaster Public Broadcasting Service of Bosnia and Herzegovina (PBSBiH) returned to the Eurovision Song Contest after a one-year absence following their relegation in 2000 as one of the six countries with the lowest average scores over the previous five contests. PBSBiH organised the national final BH Eurosong 2001 in order to select the Bosnian entry for 2001 contest in Copenhagen, Denmark. Nineteen entries participated during the show on 10 March 2001 and an eight-member jury selected "Hano" performed by Nino Pršeš as the winner.

Bosnia and Herzegovina competed in the Eurovision Song Contest which took place on 12 May 2001. Performing during the show in position 3, Bosnia and Herzegovina placed fourteenth out of the 23 participating countries, scoring 29 points.

Background

The nation's best placing in the contest was seventh, which it achieved in 1999 with the song "Putnici" performed by Dino and Béatrice. The Bosnian national broadcaster, Public Broadcasting Service of Bosnia and Herzegovina (PBSBiH), broadcasts the event within Bosnia and Herzegovina and organises the selection process for the nation's entry. From 1994 to 1997, PBSBiH selected the Bosnian artist through an internal selection process, while a national final was set up to choose the song. In 1999, the broadcaster selected the Bosnian entry through a national final that featured several artists and songs, a procedure that was continued for their 2001 entry.

Before Eurovision

BH Eurosong 2001 
The sixth edition of BH Eurosong, BH Eurosong 2001, was held on 10 March 2001 at the PBSBiH Studios in Sarajevo and hosted by Selma Alispahić and Darko Gutović. The show was broadcast on BHTV1 and BH Radio 1.

Competing entries
The broadcaster opened the submission period for composers to submit their songs up until 20 December 2000. 115 valid submissions out of 170 were received at the closing of the deadline and a selection committee consisting of representatives from the two Bosnian broadcasters RTVBiH and SRT selected nineteen songs to compete in the national final. Among the competing artists was 1996 Bosnian Eurovision entrant Amila Glamočak.

Final
The final was held on 10 March 2001 at the PBSBiH studios in Sarajevo. Nineteen entries participated and the votes from a jury panel selected "Hano" performed by Nino Pršeš as the winner. The eight-member jury panel that voted during the show consisted of Zlatan Fazlić (1993 Bosnian Eurovision entrant), Jasmin Komić (professor at the University of Banja Luka), Miro Janjanin (musician), Aida Kurtović (Executive Director of Partnerships in Health at Bosnia and Herzegovina), Mladen Matović (student at the University of Banja Luka), Predrag Đajić (musician), Anica Vrilić (music student at the University of Banja Luka) and Branislav Petar Štumf (musician).

At Eurovision
According to Eurovision rules, the host country, the "Big Four" (France, Germany, Spain and the United Kingdom), and the 12 countries with the highest average scores between the 1996 and 2000 contests competed in the final. On 21 November 2000, a special allocation draw was held which determined the running order and Bosnia and Herzegovina was set to perform in position 15, following the entry from the Iceland and before the entry from Norway. Bosnia and Herzegovina finished in fourteenth place with 29 points.

The show was broadcast in Bosnia and Herzegovina on BHTV1 with commentary by Ismeta Dervoz-Krvavac. The Bosnian spokesperson, who announced the Bosnian votes during the show, was Segmedina Srna.

Voting 
Below is a breakdown of points awarded to Bosnia and Herzegovina and awarded by Bosnia and Herzegovina in the contest. The nation awarded its 12 points to France in the contest.

References

2001
Countries in the Eurovision Song Contest 2001
Eurovision